Asymmetric price transmission (sometimes abbreviated as APT and informally called "rockets and feathers" ) refers to pricing phenomenon occurring when downstream prices react in a different manner to upstream price changes, depending on the characteristics of upstream prices or changes in those prices.

The simplest example is when prices of ready products increase promptly whenever prices of inputs increase, but take time to decrease after input price decreases.

Introduction

Terminology 
In business terms, price transmission means the process in which upstream prices affect downstream prices.  Upstream prices should be thought of in terms of main inputs prices (for processing/manufacturing, etc.) or prices quoted on higher market levels (e.g. wholesale markets). Accordingly, downstream prices should be thought of in terms of output prices (for processing/manufacturing, etc.) or prices quoted on lower market levels (e.g. retail markets).

Background theory 
Since (by definition) upstream and downstream prices are related:
in absence of external shocks, some kind of economic equilibrium relationship between those two should exist;
external shocks to the system (i.e. shocks to downstream or upstream prices) should trigger short- and long-run adjustment towards the long-run equilibrium, as:
rational economic agents price their goods so as to maximize their constant utility function;
in the long run prices of goods should reflect their scarcity.

Example of price transmission 
Price transmission is best illustrated by an example.  Assume that:
commodities analysed are:
crude oil - global upstream, and 
petroleum - local downstream;
market for petroleum in question is small compared to market for crude oil (in terms of quantities sold / bought), so that downstream prices cannot drive upstream prices;
in the short run, only crude oil prices drive petroleum prices (i.e., prices of other inputs are assumed to be constant);
no substitutes to petroleum are available in the short run.

Given the above, one might expect that:
increases and decreases in crude oil prices trigger appropriate changes downstream;
resulting changes are symmetric in terms of absolute size / timing.
	
Such behaviour, predicted by all canonical industry / market pricing models (perfect competition, monopoly) is called symmetric price transmission. 

In contrast to symmetric price transmission, asymmetric price transmission is said to exist when the adjustment of prices is not homogeneous with respect to characteristics external or internal to the system. As an example of asymmetric price transmission consider a situation when:
increases in crude oil prices lead to immediate increases in petroleum prices, but decreases in crude oil prices take time to be passed down to petroleum prices. This asymmetry is referred to as time asymmetry, or

combination of the time asymmetry and the size asymmetry (i.e., a situation when increases in crude oil prices lead to more significant changes (in absolute values) in petroleum prices than decreases).

One should remember that the size asymmetry cannot occur on its own. If that had been the case the upstream prices and downstream prices would drift apart. Since downstream prices and upstream prices are by definition related to each other, this cannot be the case. Accordingly, size asymmetry can occur only together with time asymmetry and only when the long-run relationship between prices is restored after the impulse shock to upstream prices.

Consequences
The issue of asymmetric price transmission received a considerable attention in economic literature because of two reasons. 

Firstly, its presence is not in line with predictions of the canonical economic theory (e.g. perfect competition and monopoly), which expect that under some regularity assumptions (such as non-kinked, convex/concave demand function) downstream responses to upstream changes should be symmetric in terms of absolute size and timing.
	
Secondly, because of the size of the some markets in which asymmetric price transmission takes place (such as petroleum markets), global dependence on some products (again oil) and the share of income spent by average household on some products (again petroleum products), asymmetric price transmission is important from the welfare point of view. One must remember that APT implies a welfare redistribution from agents downstream to agents upstream (presumably consumers to large energy companies); it has serious political and social consequences.

References
GAO (1993). Energy security and policy: Analysis of the pricing of crude oil and petroleum products: Report by General Accounting Office.  GAO, Washington, D.C.
Meyer, J.; von Cramon-Taubadel, S. (2004). Asymmetric price transmission: A survey. Journal of Agricultural Economics, 55(3): pp. 581–611.
Peltzman, S. (2000). Prices rise faster than they fall. Journal of Political Economy, 108(3), 466:501.
Tappata, M. (2008). Rockets and Feathers. Understanding Asymmetric Pricing.
Wlazlowski, S. S. (2003). Petrol and crude oil prices: Asymmetric price transmission. Ekonomia / Economics, 11: pp. 1–25.	

Business terms
Pricing
Petroleum economics